The Fall of Terra is a compilation of adventures that was published by FASA in 1996 for the mecha role-playing game BattleTech.

Contents
The Fall of Terra is a soft-cover book by Chris Hartford and Bryan Nystul, with artwork by Tom Baxa, John Bridegroom, Storn Cook, Kevin Long, James Nelson, Mike Nielsen, and Christopher Trevas, and cover art by Doug Chaffee. The book contains a compilation of sixteen BattleTech adventures that describe the story of the struggle for Earth between enemy groups.

The book also includes special rules for moving on ice, snow and mud. Some of the adventures require rules and data from previously published source books BattleSpace, MechWarrior, and MechWarrior Companion.

Reception
In the August 1997 edition of Dragon (Issue #238), Rick Swan gave a good recommendation for this book, saying, "If you’re a BattleTech veteran happy with the third edition (editions one and two are obsolete), there’s no compelling reason to invest in version four. Instead, I direct your attention The Fall of Terra, a compilation of first-rate scenarios dealing with the control of planet Earth."

Reviews
Arcane #12

References

BattleTech supplements